Stårheim (or Torvika) is a village in the municipality of Stad in Vestland county, Norway.

The urban centre of the village is called Torvika by Statistics Norway.

Church

Stårheim Church is the parish church located in the village of Stårheim.  It is part of the Diocese of Bjørgvin and the Nordfjord prosti (deanery).  The church building, which was constructed during 1864, can seat 340 people. It was built from drawings by architect Christian Heinrich Grosch.

History
Arne Ivarsson  (Árni Ívarsson á Stoðreimi ), a prominent lendmann from Stårheim during the 12th century, was a husband of Ingrid Ragnvaldsdotter, mother of King Inge I of Norway. Their son, Nicholas Arnesson, became the Bishop of Oslo.
Stårheim is the home of a few celebrities, most notably journalist Karoline Vårdal.

Sports
The local sports team is Stårheim IL.

References

Villages in Vestland
Stad, Norway